Aïn Turk may refer to:

 Aïn Turk, Bouïra, a municipality or commune of the Bouïra province, Algeria
 Aïn El Turk, Oran, a municipality or commune of the Oran province, Algeria